Zeller See Nature Reserve or Zellersee Nature Reserve may refer to:

 Zeller See (Kißlegg), nature reserve in the municipality of Kißlegg, county of Ravensburg, Baden-Württemberg, Germany
 Zeller See (Salzburg) Nature Reserve in Salzburger Land, Austria
 Zellersee (Irrsee) Nature Reservein the Salzkammergut, Upper Austria, see Irrsee
 Zeller See Protected Area in Salzburger Land, Austria

See also 
 Zeller See (disambiguation)